Nate Boulton (born May 23, 1980) is an American politician serving in the Iowa Senate since 2017. Boulton, a Democrat, represents the 20th District.  Boulton was first elected in 2016 to replace retiring Democratic Senator Dick Dearden.

In May 2017, Boulton announced his candidacy for the Iowa gubernatorial election, 2018 with a video on Twitter. He suspended his campaign in May 2018 shortly after The Des Moines Register published the accounts of three women accusing Boulton of sexual misconduct.

Early life and education 
Nate grew up in Columbus Junction.

He earned his J.D. degree from Drake Law School in 2005 and was admitted to the Iowa bar that year. He also holds a Master’s of Public Administration from Drake University and a Bachelor’s in history and political science from Simpson College. He has served on the Simpson College Alumni Board and as an adjunct professor at Simpson.

Career 
Outside the legislature, Boulton is a partner with Hedberg & Boulton, where he practices in workers compensation, personal injury and labor law. He has served as vice-president of the Iowa Association for Justice and as president of the Iowa Workers' Compensation Advisory Committee. He also acts as a grader for the Iowa Bar Exam. He has taught courses in labor law at Drake Law School, sports law and business law at Simpson College, and organizational management and moral leadership at William Penn University.

State senate 
Boulton was elected to his first term in the Iowa Senate in 2016. He represents the people of Senate District 16 on the Northeast side of Des Moines and in Pleasant Hill.

He is ranking member on the Labor & Business Relations Committee. He also serves on the appropriations, commerce and judiciary committees.

Gubernatorial campaign (2017–2018)
On May 4, 2017 Boulton announced his candidacy for Governor of Iowa. His platform includes fighting for workers' rights, as he was an outspoken opponent of the collective bargaining bill that was passed by the Republican led Iowa Legislature. He also voiced strong support for public education in Iowa. Former Presidential Candidate Martin O'Malley lauded Boulton's announcement, writing on Twitter, "The future is now. Congratulations @NateBoulton on entering the race for #IAGov #iapolitics".

Boulton suspended his campaign in May 2018 after The Des Moines Register published the accounts of three women accusing Boulton of sexual misconduct. The allegations against Boulton included non-consensual groping and frotteurism.

Electoral history

References

External links
 Nate Boulton at Iowa Legislature
 
 Biography at Ballotpedia
 Campaign Website

1980 births
Living people
21st-century American politicians
Democratic Party Iowa state senators
Drake University alumni
Drake University Law School alumni
People from Columbus Junction, Iowa
Simpson College alumni